Abdul Hafeez Mirza (2 October 1939 – 17 November 2021) was a Pakistani tourism worker, cultural activist and an educationist. He worked as general manager at Tourism Development Corporation Punjab (TDCP), and served as a Consultant for Tourism Corporation Khyber Pakhtunkwha (TCKP),formerly known as Sarhad Tourism Development Corporation . He also worked for Pakistan Tourism Development Corporation (PTDC). He worked as the managing director of a tour operating company,  Montana Travel Service ltd. He was also a professor of French Language and was an Author of several books on French Language and Tourism.

Mirza was involved in the policy-making for Tourism in Pakistan. He was awarded by the Government of France with the Ordre de Palmes Academiques award in 2015 for the services he rendered in the fields of education and culture.

Early life and education 
Mirza was born to a Muslim family in Lahore during British India. His father Mirza Sardar Baig served in the British-Indian army and the office of the British Resident at Lahore before Partition. Mirza was educated at Government College University and the University of the Punjab. He then went to France in 1960 to complete his master's degree in French from Toulouse University.

In 1974, Mirza completed an advanced course in French language teaching from the Catholic University of Paris. He also completed a German language certification from the Goethe-Institut in Lahore.

Mirza also completed an advanced course on Economy and Politics of International Tourism organized by the UNWTO (United Nations World Tourism Organization) held at University of Paris-Sorbonne in 1992. Mirza was among nine individuals who were selected for that course from all over the world.

Career 
Mirza returned to Pakistan after completing his master's degree in 1964 and started out as a professor of French. He taught French at Alliance Francaise Lahore, Aitchison College Lahore, Forman Christian College University and Lahore American School from 1964 to 1974. Mirza was the first ever teacher at Alliance Francaise Lahore.

Mirza shifted his career from education to the travel and tourism industry. In 1976 he established a travel and Tour operating company, Montana Travel Service limited. During the 70s and 80s, Mirza mostly dealt with European tourist groups and Sikh religious groups in Pakistan.
 
 
Mirza was nominated by the Planning Commission of Pakistan to head the Working Group for formulation of tourism policies for the 7th Five year Plan of Pakistan (1988–1993).

Mirza joined Tourism Development Corporation Punjab in 1987 and remained general manager until 1995. He also worked as a consultant for Sarhad Tourism in 1996.

Mirza worked for Pakistan Tourism Development Corporation (PTDC) in 1999. He conducted several courses on tourism and tour guiding.

 
 
Mirza represented Pakistan at various International tourism forums, including a Dutch tourism fair Vakantie 87 held at Utrecht, and at ITB Berlin in 1990 and 1991.

Mirza resumed teaching in 1998. He worked as a visiting professor at the University of Punjab from 2003 to 2012. He taught French and hotel management at the College of Tourism and Hotel Management (COTHM), and French and Business English at National College of Business Administration and Economics. Mirza also taught French at Alliance Francaise Lahore from 2010 till his retirement in 2012. He received the Ordre des Palmes Academiques from the Government of France in 2015.

Notable works and publications 
 Reincarnation of Another Kind; Biography of Pakistani-French fashion designer Mehmood Bhatti.
 A French Course for Beginners; a guide for learning French from English.
 Guide to Lahore; a travel guide book for tourists, published in 1985 (written in 3 languages : French, English and German).
 Introuction to Pakistan; published in 1989.
 "Mualim e Fransisi"; a guidebook for learning French from Urdu, published by Aziz Book Depot, Lahore in 1998.
 "Promoting Domestic Tourism"; an article published on October 29, 1993, in Friday Review, The Nation.
 "Le Pakistan: Remp Art et Enjeu Mondial"; an article published on 6 February 1987 in French newspaper Nord Eclair.
 "Tourism Development in Pakistan"; an article published in the July 8th, 1993 in The Nation, Special Supplement.

References 

1939 births
2021 deaths
People from Lahore
Recipients of the Ordre des Palmes Académiques
Tourism
Pakistani writers
Pakistani educators
French language in Asia
Tourism in Pakistan
University of Paris alumni
University of Toulouse alumni
University of the Punjab alumni
Pakistani books
Pakistani culture
Government College University, Lahore alumni
Government College University, Lahore
Academic staff of the University of the Punjab